Toshio Kuroda was a Japanese professor emeritus of Islamic studies and an author of many books on Islam and other religions. He is the author of scholarly books and articles.
He taught at the Iran Research Institute of Philosophy in Tehran.

Life and academic career 
Kuroda was a professor of philosophy at the Iran Research Institute of Philosophy, in Tehran, formerly the Imperial Iranian Academy of Philosophy. He returned to Japan after the Iranian Revolution in 1979. He wrote, seemingly more assiduously, many books and articles in Japanese on Oriental thought and its significance.

Works
Kuroda is the author and  translator of over twenty books on topics such as Islamic history, Islamic economics and Islamic philosophy.
He translated The elements of Islamic Metaphysics by Muhammad Husayn Tabataba'i.
He completed the translation of the Nahj al-Balagha to Japanese.

Awards and honors
In 2012, he won one of the top prizes at the 29rd edition of Iran Book of the Year Award.

Death
Kuroda died in Japan on 6 May 2017.

References 

2017 deaths
Japanese translators
Japanese writers
Japanese non-fiction writers
Translators of the Quran into Japanese
Islamic studies scholars
Iranologists
20th-century translators
Year of birth missing